A Floating City, or sometimes translated The Floating City, is an adventure novel by French writer Jules Verne first published in 1871 in France. At the time of its publication, the novel enjoyed a similar level of popularity as Around the World in Eighty Days. The first UK and US editions of the novel appeared in 1874. Jules Férat provided the original illustrations for the novel.

Plot 

It tells of a woman who, on board the ship Great Eastern with her abusive husband, finds that the man she loves is also on board.

References

External links

 Illustrations  by Jules Férat
 A Floating City (English translation) at MobileRead

1871 French novels
Novels by Jules Verne
England in fiction
Novels set on ships